General de División Juan Martín Paleo is an Argentine General who serves as the incumbent Chief of the Joint Chiefs of Staff of the Armed Forces of the Argentine Republic. Prior to his appointment, he served as the commander of the Rapid Deployment Force of the Argentine Army.

Background
He graduated from the Colegio Militar de la Nación in 1983 as an infantry officer, and has spent his career commanding infantry and special forces units. He obtained a degree in Strategy and Organization, and in Educational Sciences. He is also specialized in Driving and Strategic Management.

He commanded various units in the Argentine Army, such as the 602 Commando Company, the 601 Assault Helicopter Battalion, the Special Operations Forces Grouping, and the IV Airbone Brigade. He also served as the Military, Naval and Aeronautical Defense Attaché in China; became deputy director of the General Directorate of Organization and Doctrine; and became the Inspector General of the Army.

He also Rapid Deployment Force, where he is also in charge of overall security measures during the 2018 G20 Buenos Aires summit. On February 28, 2020,  in a ceremony at the Libertador Building, he was appointed by President Alberto Fernández as the new Chief of the Joint Chiefs of Staff, replacing Lieutenant General Bari del Valle Sosa.

Awards
 Faith in the Cause Medal by the Colombian Army

References

Argentine generals
1962 births
Living people